Martin Eriksson (born 1971) is a retired Swedish pole vaulter. Martin Eriksson may also refer to:

Martin Eriksson (cyclist) (born 1992), Swedish male cyclo-cross cyclist
Martin Eriksson, birth name of E-Type (musician) (born 1965), Swedish eurodance musician
Martin Ericsson (born 1980), former Swedish footballer